Ptilodictya is an extinct genus of bryozoan of the family Ptilodictyidae. It formed bifoliate branched colonies, with branches ranging from under 1 to 3 mm wide. Colonies' autozooecia are rectangular and autozooecial apertures are in the shape of rounded rectangles.

Species
Species include:

References

Prehistoric bryozoan genera